M45 or variants may refer to:

Military equipment 
 Carl Gustaf m/45, a 9×19mm Swedish submachine gun
 M45, a variant of the M26 Pershing heavy/medium tank of the United States Army
 M45 (missile), a French Navy submarine-launched ballistic missile
 M45 Quadmount, a weapon mounting consisting of four "heavy barrel" .50 caliber M2 Browning machine guns
 MEU(SOC) pistol (also M45 MEUSOC), a magazine-fed, recoil-operated, single-action, semiautomatic pistol
 M45, a gas mask currently issued in the United States

Transport 
 Infinity M45, a rebadged Japanese-spec Nissan Gloria of the Infiniti M line
 M-45 (Michigan highway), a state trunkline highway in the US state of Michigan
 M-45 (Spain), a highway bypass built in the Community of Madrid of regional importance
 M45 (Cape Town), a Metropolitan Route in Cape Town, South Africa
 M45 (Johannesburg), a Metropolitan Route in Johannesburg, South Africa
 M45 (Durban), a Metropolitan Route in Durban, South Africa
 M45 motorway, a motorway in Northamptonshire and Warwickshire, England

Other 
 M 45, an age category of masters athletics
 M45, a single-nucleotide polymorphism that is a component of Haplogroup P1
 Pleiades (also M45), an open star cluster containing middle-aged, hot B-type stars
 Yahoo M45, a computer cluster announced in November 2007 by Yahoo